Count Carl Johan Magnus Björnstjerna (7 April 1886 – 20 February 1982) was a Swedish officer and horse rider who competed in the 1928 Summer Olympics. He and his horse Kornett won the bronze medal as part of the Swedish jumping team after finishing ninth in the individual jumping.

Career
Björnstjerna was born on 7 April 1886 in Stockholm, Sweden, the son of colonel, count Gustaf Björnstjerna and his wife Ellen Jonzon.

Career
Björnstjerna became a lieutenant in the Life Regiment Dragoons in 1909 and was promoted to ryttmästare in 1921. He then served as a staff adjutant and captain of the General Staff in 1921 and as ryttmästare and squadron commander in the Life Regiment Dragoons in 1925. Björnstjerna was appointed chief adjutant and major of the General Staff in 1928 and then served as head of the General Staff's Foreign Department from 1930. He was promoted to lieutenant colonel and was posted as military attaché in London, Paris and Brussels from 1933 to 1935. Björnstjerna was promoted to  colonel in 1935 and served as commanding officer of Norrland Dragoon Regiment from 1935 to 1940. He transferred to the reserve in 1946.

Personal life
Björnstjerna was married 1915–1954 to Sonja Wallenberg (1881–1970), the daughter of Marcus Wallenberg Sr. and Amalia Hagdahl. They had four daughters. In 1956 he married Ulla Nilsson.

Dates of rank
1909 – Lieutenant
1921 – Ryttmästare
1928 – Major
1933 – Lieutenant colonel
1935 – Colonel

Awards and decorations
Björnstjerna's awards:

Swedish
    King Gustaf V's Jubilee Commemorative Medal (1928)
   Commander 1st Class of the Order of the Sword (15 November 1941)
   Knight of the Order of Vasa
   Knight of the Order of Saint John

Foreign
   3rd Class of the Order of the Cross of the Eagle
   Commander 2nd Class of the Order of the White Rose of Finland
   Commander of the Order of the Three Stars
   Commander of the Order of the British Empire
   Knight of the Order of the Dannebrog
   Officer of the Legion of Honour
   Officer of the Order of the Lithuanian Grand Duke Gediminas
   Officer of the Order of Orange-Nassau with swords
   Knight 1st Class of the Order of St. Olav
   Officer of the Order of Polonia Restituta
   Knight of the Order of Leopold with swords
   Knight of the Order of the Crown of Italy

References

1886 births
1982 deaths
Swedish male equestrians
Swedish show jumping riders
Olympic equestrians of Sweden
Equestrians at the 1928 Summer Olympics
Olympic bronze medalists for Sweden
Olympic medalists in equestrian
Swedish Army colonels
Military personnel from Stockholm
Medalists at the 1928 Summer Olympics
Swedish military attachés